The Polyfuze Method is the second studio album by American musician Kid Rock. Released in 1993 by Continuum and Top Dog Records, the album marked the beginning of Kid Rock's shift from hip hop music to rap rock. The Polyfuze Method saw Kid Rock further develop his "trailer-park pimp-daddy persona".

Producer Mike E. Clark worked with Kid Rock to give the album a more rock-oriented sound with live instruments, including heavy metal guitar and flute. The album was noted for its extensive sampling-based  sound showcasing "a love and mastery of Paul's Boutique-esque sample-collage based production".

Recording

In 1990, Kid Rock signed with Jive Records and released his debut album, Grits Sandwiches for Breakfast. Despite the album's success, Kid Rock was dropped by Jive. In 1992, Kid Rock signed with Detroit independent record label Continuum; the following year, he recorded his second studio album, The Polyfuze Method with producer Mike E. Clark.

Artistry
The Polyfuze Method shows Kid Rock developing a rap rock sound. The Village Voice writer Chaz Kangas described Kid Rock on this album as having "a love and mastery of Paul's Boutique-esque sample-collage based production". Producer Mike E. Clark worked with Kid Rock to help give the album more of a rock-oriented sound than his debut, utilizing live heavy metal guitars and sampling rock artists like Pink Floyd, as well as hiring a flute player to perform on the album. The album served as a crossroads between his hip hop and rock career, still maintaining a strong hip hop sound carried over from Grits Sandwiches for Breakfast, while beginning Kid Rock's use of rock and roll and country influences via sampling. A 2017 profile by Billboard categorized the album as being defined by "trippy AOR samples".

According to Allmusic's Johnny Loftus, The Polyfuze Method "represents a significant leap forward not only in the development of Kid Rock's unlikely mixture of classic rock, hip-hop, and country influences, but his own trailer-park pimp-daddy persona."  Loftus feels the music on The Polyfuze Method was influenced by Public Enemy and N.W.A. He describes "Killin' Brain Cells" as being categorized by "big percussion and a funky guitar sample", and that the song's lyrics were defined by "the confluence of blind bravado, hard liquor"—these characteristics, along with the mixture of rock and hip hop, foreshadowed Kid Rock's 1998 multiplatinum major label album Devil Without a Cause, according to Loftus.

Chaz Kangas, writing for The Village Voice, said that The Polyfuze Method "his approach’s metamorphosis into painting with broad strokes of other genres in his work".  "Prodigal Son", an autobiographical song, lyrically describes Kid Rock leaving his family home to pursue a music career. Kangas wrote that "In retrospect, the song today almost sounds like his outlaw manifesto." The song "Fuck You Blind" contained live guitars, which was not typical of the era's hip hop. Atypical of the album's sound was the more commercial-sounding "U Don't Know Me", which Kid Rock recorded as a joke to prove that "anyone can [write a pop song]".

Release and reception

Kid Rock intended to film a music video for the song "Prodigal Son", but Continuum Records dissuaded him against doing so, in favor of a video for the more commercial-sounding "U Don't Know Me", which the label had put out as a single and on the album without Kid Rock's knowledge or approval. The video cost $30,000 to produce. With the production of the "Back from the Dead" music video, Kid Rock was given more creative control, being allowed to produce and direct the video. At $1,500, the video also cost less than the "U Don't Know Me" video. After signing with Atlantic Records, Kid Rock licensed The Polyfuze Method to the label. The album was not offered for sale when Kid Rock's catalog became available on iTunes.

The album received mixed reviews upon release. In a retrospective review, Allmusic's Johnny Loftus gave the album three out of five stars, writing, "Despite its strong suggestion of what was to come, Polyfuze Method doesn't really go anywhere." The Village Voice, however, praised the album's sample-based sound and called the song "Prodigal Son" a "classic".

Track listings

 

Some of these tracks were re-recorded for the compilation The History of Rock, while "I Am the Bullgod" was re-recorded for the album Devil Without a Cause.

Personnel
Bob Ebling – Drums
Bill Grant – Bass Guitar, Guitar
Kid Rock – Guitar, Loops, Bass Guitar, Producer
Chris Peters – Guitar, Bass Guitar
Dono Zoyes – Bass Guitar
Jon Slow – Flute
Peg Leg Sam – Harmonica
Mike Henry – Guitar on "In So Deep"
D-Square – Producer
Mike E. Clark – Producer

References

Kid Rock albums
1993 albums
Albums produced by Mike E. Clark
Midwest hip hop albums
Rap rock albums by American artists
Continuum Records albums